Teresa de Jesús Alcocer y Gasca (born 25 October 1952) is a Mexican politician from the National Action Party. In 2009 she served as Deputy of the LX Legislature of the Mexican Congress representing Yucatán.

References

1952 births
Living people
Politicians from Yucatán (state)
Women members of the Chamber of Deputies (Mexico)
National Action Party (Mexico) politicians
21st-century Mexican politicians
21st-century Mexican women politicians
People from Valladolid, Yucatán
Deputies of the LX Legislature of Mexico
Members of the Chamber of Deputies (Mexico) for Yucatán